Whatever is the first solo album by the American singer-songwriter Aimee Mann, released in 1993.

"I've Had It" is one of the songs featured in Nick Hornby's book 31 Songs. The album, with special note for the song "4th of July", was included by Elvis Costello in his "Costello's 500" list for Vanity Fair. It has also been included in the 1001 Albums You Must Hear Before You Die list.

Reception

Whatever received mostly positive reviews from critics. Most praised her sense of melody and the wordplay of her lyrics, exemplified by Entertainment Weekly in "hooky songs" and "evocative lyrics". The Los Angeles Times reflected this by saying she "mixes words like a master, catching lifetimes of ache and Angst" in her songs while the Chicago Tribune compared her to Elvis Costello. Rolling Stone cited her music as "sunny, surreal melodies" with "razor-sharp lyrics". The Independents Andy Gill highly recommended the album, concluding that "it's the tension between Mann's disarmingly direct, conversational lyric style and the complexity of her musical design that gives Whatever its peculiar charge." On the other hand, Robert Christgau only cited "Mr. Harris" as a "choice cut", finding nothing else to say about it.

The album was included in the book 1001 Albums You Must Hear Before You Die and in Pitchfork's "150 Best Albums of the 1990s."

Commercial performance
As of February 2001, combined sales for two releases of Whatever stand at 170,000 copies sold in United States.

Track listing

Original release
All tracks by Aimee Mann, except where noted.
"I Should've Known" – 4:53
"Fifty Years After the Fair" – 3:46
"4th of July" – 3:21
"Could've Been Anyone" (Lyrics by Mann, Music by Mann, Jules Shear, Marty Willson-Piper) – 4:23
"Put Me on Top" – 3:28
"Stupid Thing" (Mann, Jon Brion) – 4:27
"Say Anything" (Mann, Jon Brion) – 4:57
"Jacob Marley's Chain" – 3:01
"Mr. Harris" – 4:05
"I Could Hurt You Now" – 4:17
"I Know There's a Word" (Mann, Jon Brion) – 3:16
"I've Had It" – 4:42
"Way Back When" – 4:05
"Nothing" – 0:09

Whatever – An Exclusive Collection
In 1994, BMG Records in Germany released a limited edition Whatever – An Exclusive Collection. This featured a second CD containing previously released B-sides. The cover of the CD was unchanged, there just being a sticker announcing the bonus material. It appears that Aimee was unaware of this release until it was mentioned in the message forum at her website in 2004, her management calling it a bootleg before it being confirmed as an official release.

Contents of the second disc:
"Jimmy Hoffa Jokes"
"4th of July" (live for Virgin 1215)
"Say Anything" (acoustic)
"Baby Blue"
"Truth on My Side" (demo, 1989)
"Fifty Years After the Fair" (demo, 1989)
"Put on Some Speed" (demo, 1989)
"Stupid Thing" (live)
"The Other End (Of the Telescope)" (live)

Personnel
Aimee Mann – vocals (all songs), electric guitar (1), bass (1–3, 5, 6, 10, 11), Dixie cup (1), acoustic guitar (3, 13), pump organ (4), Mellotron (5), percussion (7), lo-fi acoustic guitar (10), nylon-string guitar (12)
Michael Hausman – drums (3, 10, 13), percussion (4), orchestral percussion (8), bass drum (12), tongue drum (12), congas (12), cymbals (12)
Jim Keltner – drums (2, 5, 6)
Milt Sutton – drums (7)
Jon Brion – drums (1, 4, 11), bass (1, 4, 7, 13), electric guitar (1, 2, 5–7, 10, 12, 13), pump organ (1, 6, 8), Mellotron (1, 3, 4, 5, 7, 8, 10), Chamberlain (1, 4, 6, 8), vocals (1, 2, 4, 5, 7, 10, 13), Optigan (2, 4, 6, 12, 13), glockenspiel (2, 4, 10), tambourine (2, 10), vibraphone (3, 4), guitar (4), piano (4, 6, 7, 9, 10, 12, 13), harmonium (6, 8), acoustic guitar (7), acoustic bass (8), kazoo (8), woodwind arrangement (9), Hammond organ (10, 13), Indian harmonium (10), bass harmonica (10, 12), keyboards (11), cottage organ (12), B-3 organ (12), Wurlitzer organ (12), celesta (12), tack piano (12), piccolo flute (12), bottles (12), turtle guitar (13), toy piano (13), marimba (13), pipes (13)
Buddy Judge – vocals (1, 10–13), acoustic guitar (5, 6, 8, 11, 13), hi-fi acoustic guitar (10), bottles (12), pipes (13)
Todd Nelson – intro guitar (1)
Randy Brion – euphonium (9), trombone (13)
Mike Breaux – oboe (9), bassoon (12)
Roger McGuinn – 12-string electric guitar (2), vocals (2)
David Coleman – electric cello (10)
The Sid Sharp Strings - Sid Sharp (9, 11), Joy Lyle (9, 11), Harry Shirinian (9, 11), Harry Shultz (9, 11)
Jimmie Haskell - string arrangement (9)

Charts

Weekly charts

Singles

References

Aimee Mann albums
1993 debut albums
Albums produced by Tony Berg
Albums produced by Jon Brion
Geffen Records albums
Albums produced by Michael Huasman